Archivo Nacional is Spanish for National Archive.  It may refer to:

 Archivo Nacional de la Memoria
 Archivo  Nacional de Chile
 Biblioteca y Archivo Nacional de Paraguay
 National Archives of Ecuador
 National Archives of Costa Rica